The Gorgona class is a series of six Coastal Transport ships of the Italian Navy, named as Moto Trasporto Costiero, MTC.

Roles 
Coastal roll-on/roll-off ship:
minelayer
containers transport
troop transport
wheeled vehicles transport
tracked vehicles transport
hydrofoils logistic support (for Sparviero hydrofoils class until 2002)
logistic support to expeditionary missions
drinking water and fuel supply for vessels, islands and military barracks

Ships

References

External links 

 Gorgona (A 5347) Marina Militare website

Ships built in Ancona
Auxiliary ships of the Italian Navy
Auxiliary transport ship classes